The 1942 Boston University Terriers football team was an American football team that represented Boston University as an independent during the 1942 college football season. The team compiled a 4–5 record and were outscored by a total of 94 to 88.

Walt Holmer was hired as the team's head coach in January 1942. He replaced Pat Hanley who was called to duty with the Marine Corps. Holmer had been the team's backfield coach for the prior eight years. Holmer later resigned his post in March 1943 to enter the Naval Reserve.

Schedule

References

Boston University
Boston University Terriers football seasons
Boston University Terriers football